The Copa Room was an entertainment nightclub showroom at the now-defunct Sands Hotel on The Las Vegas Strip in Las Vegas, Nevada. It was demolished in 1996 when the Sands Hotel was imploded.

It was noteworthy for the many popular entertainers who performed there, including members of the Rat Pack, Count Basie, Ella Fitzgerald, Judy Garland, Lena Horne, Jimmy Durante, Tony Bennett, Nat King Cole, Peggy Lee, Edith Piaf and Bobby Darin, among others.

It was also the recording venue for several live albums, including Frank Sinatra's Sinatra at the Sands, Sammy Davis Jr.'s That's All! and The Sounds of '66, and Dean Martin's Live at the Sands Hotel - An Evening of Music, Laughter and Hard Liquor.

The Copa Room's showgirls were known as "The Copa Girls." The showroom took its name from the famed Copacabana in New York City. Hotel manager Jack Entratter used to be in charge of the New York venue for more than 12 years, where his showgirls were also known as the Copa Girls.  Entratter designed the Copa Room to replicate the Brazilian decor at the Copacabana. The room seated about 400 people. Entratter never allowed his showgirls to appear onstage totally nude.

The musical director during the Copa Room's 1950s and 1960s heyday was Antonio Morelli.

In 1981 The Sands in Atlantic City, New Jersey, opened and renamed its showroom the Copa Room. The showroom featured many of the same entertainers as its Las Vegas counterpart.

Notable performers

Musicians:
5th Dimension
Air Supply
The Ames Brothers
Nancy Ames
Paul Anka
Ray Anthony
Louis Armstrong
Desi Arnaz
Frankie Avalon
Pearl Bailey
Count Basie
Shirley Bassey
Tony Bennett
Pat Boone
James Brown
Solomon Burke
Sam Butera
Lana Cantrell
The Carpenters
Vikki Carr
Diahann Carroll
Chubby Checker
Cher
Don Cherry
Roy Clark
Rosemary Clooney
The Coasters
Eddie Cochran
Nat King Cole
Bing Crosby
Vic Damone
Bobby Darin
Sammy Davis Jr.
Martin Denny
Marlene Dietrich
Bob Dylan
Billy Eckstine
The Everly Brothers
Lena Horne
Nelson Eddy
Gloria Estefan
Eddie Fisher
Ella Fitzgerald
The Four Tops
Judy Garland
Bobbie Gentry
Georgia Gibbs
Robert Goulet
Buddy Greco
Phil Harris
Don Ho
Lena Horne
The Ink Spots
Harry James
Fran Jeffries
Jack Jones
Louis Jordan
Quincy Jones
Kessler Twins
Sonny King
The Kingston Trio
Gladys Knight & the Pips
Frankie Laine
Carol Lawrence
Steve Lawrence and Eydie Gormé
Peggy Lee
The Lennon Sisters
Jerry Lee Lewis
Little Anthony & the Imperials
Trini Lopez
Gloria Loring
Jeanette MacDonald
Dean Martin
Tony Martin
Al Martino
Johnny Mathis
Marilyn Maye
Marilyn McCoo
The McGuire Sisters
Jimmy McHugh
Robert Merrill
The Mills Brothers
Liza Minnelli
Jane Morgan
Anthony Newley
Wayne Newton
Patti Page
Jan Peerce
Peter, Paul & Mary
Bernadette Peters
Edith Piaf
Marguerite Piazza
Ezio Pinza
Jane Powell
Louis Prima
Sue Raney
Johnnie Ray
Helen Reddy
Della Reese
The Righteous Brothers
Johnny Rivers
Smokey Robinson
Linda Ronstadt
Bobby Rydell
Tommy Sands
Mongo Santamaria
Neil Sedaka
Doc Severinsen
Sha Na Na
Dinah Shore
Frank Sinatra
Frank Sinatra Jr.
Keely Smith
O.C. Smith
The Staples Singers
Kay Starr
Kaye Stevens
The Sylvers
The Temptations
B.J. Thomas
The Three Degrees
Mel Tormé
Sophie Tucker
Leslie Uggams
Jerry Vale
Dana Valery
Rudy Vallee
Frankie Valli 
Sylvie Vartan
Sarah Vaughan
Bobby Vinton
Dionne Warwick
Mary Wilson
Nancy Wilson
Tammy Wynette
Timi Yuro
Comedians:
Don Adams
Allen & Rossi
Louie Anderson
Dave Barry
Milton Berle
Joey Bishop
Elayne Boosler
David Brenner
Marty Brill
Foster Brooks
Johnny Brown
Carol Burnett
George Burns
Ruth Buzzi
John Byner
Sid Caesar
Charlie Callas
Jack Carter
Myron Cohen
Bobby Collins
Pat Cooper
Bill Cosby
Norm Crosby
Billy Crystal
Rodney Dangerfield
Phyllis Diller
Jeff Dunham
Jimmy Durante
Wayland Flowers and Madame 
Gallagher
Paul Gilbert
George Gobel
Frank Gorshin
Shecky Greene
Bob Hope
Spike Jones
Betty and Jane Kean
Alan King
Sam Kinison
Murray Langston
Jerry Lewis
Joe E. Lewis
Richard Lewis
Rich Little
Carlos Mencia
Corbett Monica
Gary Morton
Jan Murray
Bob Newhart
Louis Nye
John Pinette
Richard Pryor
The Ritz Brothers
Joan Rivers
Paul Rodriguez
Rowan & Martin
Rita Rudner
Nipsey Russell
Mort Sahl
Dick Shawn
Allan Sherman
Red Skelton
Stiller and Meara
Alan Sues
Judy Tenuta
Fred Travalena
Danny Thomas
Jerry Van Dyke
Jackie Vernon
Slappy White
JoAnne Worley
Dancers/Other Celebrities:
Susan Anton
Tallulah Bankhead
Ray Bolger
John Brascia
Francis Brunn
Bruce Cabot
Cyd Charisse
Noël Coward
Denise Darcel
Patty Duke
Nanette Fabray
Lola Falana
The Four Step Brothers
Teresa Graves
Peter Lind Hayes
Mary Healy
Florence Henderson
Gregory Hines
Maurice Hines
Van Johnson
Paula Kelly
Peter Lawford
Michele Lee
Sheldon Leonard
Hal Le Roy
Shirley MacLaine
Dave Madden
Jayne Mansfield
Peter Marshall
Sid Melton
Rita Moreno
The Nicholas Brothers
Juliet Prowse
Debbie Reynolds
Sugar Ray Robinson
Ginger Rogers
Jane Russell
Connie Stevens
Mamie Van Doren
Shani Wallis
Patrice Wymore

References 

Las Vegas Strip
Defunct nightclubs in the Las Vegas Valley
Drinking establishments in Nevada
Theatres completed in 1952
1952 establishments in Nevada
1996 disestablishments in Nevada